Zagórki may refer to the following places:
Zagórki, Łódź Voivodeship (central Poland)
Zagórki, Podlaskie Voivodeship (north-east Poland)
Zagórki, Pomeranian Voivodeship (north Poland)
Zagórki, Człuchów County in Pomeranian Voivodeship (north Poland)
Zagórki, West Pomeranian Voivodeship (north-west Poland)